Sideri is a surname. Notable people with the surname include:

Cornelia Sideri (1938–2017), Romanian sprint canoer
Giorgio Sideri (fl. 1537–1565), Cretan geographer
Ion Sideri (born 1937), Romanian sprint canoer

See also
Sideris